Three Fat Men is a 1966 Soviet fantasy film directed by Aleksey Batalov and Iosif Shapiro based on the eponymous novel by Yury Olesha.

Cast 
 Lina Braknytė as Suok (in some scenes voiced by Alisa Freindlich)
 Pyotr Artemyev as Tutti 
 Aleksey Batalov as Tibul
 Valentin Nikulin as Gaspar
 Aleksandr Orlov as August
 Rina Zelyonaya as Ganimed
Roman Filippov as Prospero
 Sergei Kulagin as Fat Man #1
 Yevgeny Morgunov as Fat Man #2
 Boris Khristoforov as Fat Man #3
 Pavel Luspekayev as Gen. Karaska (half-voiced by Grigory Gai)
Boris Ardov as Capt. Bonaventura
Nikolai Valyano as Chancellor (voiced by Nikolay Trofimov)
Nikolai Kornoukhov as balloon seller
Viktor Sergachyov as Razdvatris
Andrei Kostrichkin as Fat Men's courtier
Aleksei Smirnov as Fat Men's confectioner
Irina Zarubina as Razdvatris' accompanist (uncredited)
Valeri Zolotukhin as regiment officer (uncredited)

References

External links 

1966 films
1960s fantasy films
Soviet fantasy films
Lenfilm films
Films based on fairy tales